Mount Pearigen is a prominent mountain (3,020 m) standing 6 nautical miles (11 km) northwest of Mount Hart in the Admiralty Mountains. Mapped by United States Geological Survey (USGS) from surveys and U.S. Navy air photos, 1960–64. Named by Advisory Committee on Antarctic Names (US-ACAN) for Lieutenant Commander Jare M. Pearigen, U.S. Navy, helicopter pilot in Operation Deep Freeze 1968, 1969 and 1970.

Mountains of Victoria Land
Borchgrevink Coast